Gene is a peer-reviewed scientific journal in genetics and molecular biology, focusing on the cloning, structure, function, as well as the biomedical and biotechnological importance of genes. It was established in 1976 and is published by Elsevier.

According to the Journal Citation Reports, the journal has a 2021 impact factor of 3.913.

References

External links 
 

Genetics journals
Elsevier academic journals
Publications established in 1976
English-language journals